Nina Tenge (born 6 April 1974 in Hamburg), also known under her stage names Nina and Nina MC, is a German former rapper and artist.

Life and work 
Tenge was born to father Rahman Nadjafi, an Afghan teacher and activist, and mother Verena Tenge, a eurythmist.

Nina Tenge gained stage experience in hip-hop clubs in Hamburg. In 2000 she became increasingly known by collaborating with Deichkind's hit single Bon Voyage. In 2001 her solo single Doppel X Chromosome gained widespread media attention. The Süddeutsche Zeitung named her "Germany's best rapper". The Goethe-Institut repeated this judgment on its website in 2005.

She entered the acting industry in 2003, playing guest roles in series and featured roles in films.

Outside of music and acting, she has been involved with her father in an association for reconstruction programmes in Afghanistan. She also trained in yoga and now works as a yoga teacher in Berlin.

Discography

Albums 

 Nikita, 2001

Singles

Filmography 

 Adam & Eve (2003)
  (2004)
 Alarm für Cobra 11 – Die Autobahnpolizei (episode Das Versprechen)
 Die Weisheit der Wolken (2008)

References 

1974 births
Living people
Artists from Hamburg
German rappers
German people of Afghan descent